JS Tenryū (ATS-4203) is a training support ship of Japan Maritime Self-Defense Force.

Development and design 
It is a ship for anti-aircraft shooting training support, and its main purpose is to launch and guide unmanned target aircraft. It was built as a complement to the air threat, higher performance of air defense weapons, and the obsolescence of the predecessor training ship .

It is a flat deck type ship type, equipped with one  single gun on the front deck. The target aircraft will be equipped with four BQM-74E Chaka III. These target aircraft are launched from the rear helipad, and up to three aircraft can be simultaneously guided and controlled by a four-sided phased array radar on the top of the ship's structure. A radar for evaluating shooting results is also installed separately.

Construction and career
Tenryū was laid down on 19 June 1998 at Sumitomo Heavy Industries, Yokosuka and launched on 14 April 1999. The vessel commissioned on 17 March 2000. Currently, she belongs to the 1st Maritime Training Support Corps of the Escort Fleet, and the fixed port is Kure.

The ship was dispatched to aid in recovery following the Great East Japan Earthquake caused by the 2011 off the Pacific coast of Tohoku Earthquake on March 11, 2011.

In February 2020, Master Sergeant Kazumi Sakoda was appointed as the first female SDF officer's senior corporal.

Gallery

References

1999 ships
Ships built by Sumitomo Heavy Industries
Training ships of the Japan Maritime Self-Defense Force